Channel 19 may refer to:

 CB radio channel 19 (27.185 MHz), unofficially a commonly monitored calling frequency for highway transport operators.

Canada
The following television stations broadcast on digital or analog channel 19 (UHF frequencies covering 500-506 MHz) in Canada:
 CBFT-DT in Montreal, Quebec
 CICA-DT in Toronto, Ontario
 CKRT-DT-6 in Trois-Pistoles, Quebec

The following television stations operate on virtual channel 19 in Canada:
 CICA-DT in Toronto, Ontario

Mexico
The following television stations broadcast on digital channel 19 in Mexico:
 XERV-TDT in Reynosa, Tamaulipas 
 XHFAS-TDT in Fronteras, Sonora 
 XHIMS-TDT in Ímuris, Sonora 
 XHZAT-TDT in Zacatecas, Zacatecas

One station operates on virtual channel 19 in Mexico:
 XHUAA-TDT in Tijuana, Baja California

See also
 Channel 19 branded TV stations in the United States
 Channel 19 digital TV stations in the United States
 Channel 19 low-power TV stations in the United States
 Channel 19 virtual TV stations in the United States

19